Team DK was a Chinese esports organization that fielded Dota 2, Heroes of the Storm and StarCraft II teams. The Dota 2 team finished 4th at The International 2014. It folded in November 2015 citing difficulty competing with more well-financed teams.

Former players 
 Xu "BurNIng" Zhilei (Dota 2)

Tournament results 
 4th — The International 2012
 5th–8th — The International 2013
 4th — The International 2014

References

External links 
 

Esports teams based in China
2010 establishments in China
2015 disestablishments in China
Heroes of the Storm teams
Defunct and inactive Dota teams
 
Esports teams established in 2010
Esports teams disestablished in 2015